Social class in Italy began early on in Ancient Rome, and this article comprises more or less how it is today.

Ancient Rome

Roman society is largely viewed as hierarchical, with slaves (servi) at the bottom, freedmen (liberti) above them, and free-born citizens (cives) at the top. Free citizens were themselves also divided by class. The broadest, and earliest, division was between the patricians, who could trace their ancestry to one of the 100 Patriarchs at the founding of the city, and the plebeians, who could not. This became less important in the later Roman Republic, as some plebeian families became wealthy and entered politics, and some patrician families fell on hard times. Anyone, patrician or plebeian, who could count a Roman consul as his ancestor was a noble (nobilis); a man who was the first of his family to hold the consulship, such as Marius or Cicero, was known as a novus homo ("new man") and ennobled his descendants. Patrician ancestry, however, still conferred considerable prestige, and many religious offices remained restricted to patricians.

A class division originally based on military service became more important. Membership of these classes was determined periodically by the Censors, according to property. The wealthiest were the Senatorial class, who dominated politics and command of the army. Next came the equestrians (equites, sometimes translated "knights"), originally those who could afford a warhorse, who formed a powerful mercantile class. Several further classes, originally based on what military equipment their members could afford, followed, with the proletarii, citizens who had no property at all, at the bottom. Before the reforms of Marius they were ineligible for military service and are often described as being just barely above freed slaves in terms of wealth and prestige.

Voting power in the Republic was dependent on class. Citizens were enrolled in voting "tribes", but the tribes of the richer classes had fewer members than the poorer ones, all the proletarii being enrolled in a single tribe. Voting was done in class order and stopped as soon as a majority of the tribes had been reached, so the poorer classes were often unable even to cast their votes.

Allied foreign cities were often given the Latin Right, an intermediary level between full citizens and foreigners (peregrini), which gave their citizens rights under Roman law and allowed their leading magistrates to become full Roman citizens. While there were varying degrees of Latin rights, the main division was between those cum suffragio ("with vote"; enrolled in a Roman tribe and able to take part in the comitia tributa) and sine suffragio ("without vote"; unable to take part in Roman politics). Some of Rome's Italian allies were given full citizenship after the Social War of 91–88 BC, and full Roman citizenship was extended to all free-born men in the Empire by Caracalla in 212. Women shared some basic rights with their male counterparts, but were not fully regarded as citizens and were thus not allowed to vote or participate in politics.

1970s Italian social classes according to Labini 
In his Essay on social classes the Italian economist Paolo Sylos Labini presented the following classification, based on his analysis of income distribution:
 Bourgeoisie (properly so called), composed by big urban and rural landowners; entrepreneurs and managers of stock companies; autonomous professionals;
 Petite bourgeoisie
 Clerical petite bourgeoisie
 Relatively autonomous petite bourgeoisie: farmers, artisans (including small professionals), traders;
 Petite bourgeoisie composed by particular categories, such as militaries and clergymen;
 Working class;
 Lumpenproletariat.

Contemporary Italian social structure
A hierarchy of social class rank in Italy today.

1. Bourgeoisie (10% of the working population) includes high-class entrepreneurs, managers, politicians, self-employed people, highest-ranking celebrities, etc.

2. White-collar middle class (17% of the working population) includes middle class workers not employed in manual work.

3. Urban petite bourgeoisie (14% of the working population), is mainly made up of shopkeepers, small-business entrepreneurs, self-employed artisans etc.

4. Rural petite bourgeoisie (10% of the working population) consists of small entrepreneurs or estate owners who operate in the countryside, mainly in agriculture and forestry.

5. Urban working class (37% of the working population) refers to the people employed in manual work.

6. Rural working class (9% of the working population) consists of people operating in the primary industry, such as farmers, loggers, fishermen etc.

References